Pterocarpus parvifolius is a taxonomic synonym of Pterocarpus macrocarpus that may refer to:

Pterocarpus parvifolius 
Pterocarpus parvifolius

References

parvifolius